Marcus Caldeira (born October 14, 2004) is a Canadian soccer player who plays for Forge FC in the Canadian Premier League and Sigma FC in League1 Ontario.

Early life
Caldeira played youth soccer with Mississauga Falcons and Erin Mills SC, later joining Sigma FC.

College career
In 2022, he committed to attend West Virginia University to play for the men's soccer team. He scored his first goals on October 7, 2022 against the Old Dominion Monarchs.

Career
On July 30, 2021, he signed a developmental contract with Forge FC of the Canadian Premier League. In April 2022, he signed a second developmental contract with Forge. He spent most of 2021 and 2022 playing with Forge's affiliate club Sigma FC in League1 Ontario.

References

External links

2004 births
Living people
Canadian soccer players
Association football forwards
Soccer players from Mississauga
Sigma FC players
Forge FC players
Canadian Premier League players
League1 Ontario players
West Virginia Mountaineers men's soccer players